"She's Never Comin' Back" is a song co-written and recorded by American country music artist Mark Collie.  It was released in October 1991 as the second single from the album Born and Raised in Black & White.  The song reached number 28 on the Billboard Hot Country Singles & Tracks chart.  The song was written by Collie and Gerry House.

Chart performance

References

1991 singles
1991 songs
Songs written by Mark Collie
Songs written by Gerry House
Song recordings produced by Doug Johnson (record producer)
Song recordings produced by Tony Brown (record producer)
MCA Records singles